Leon Jensen (born 19 May 1997) is a German professional footballer who plays as a midfielder for Karlsruher SC.

Career
In May 2018, following Werder Bremen II's relegation from the 3. Liga, it was announced Jensen would be one of ten players to leave the club.

References

External links
 
 

Living people
1997 births
Footballers from Berlin
German footballers
Association football midfielders
SV Werder Bremen II players
F91 Dudelange players
FSV Zwickau players
Karlsruher SC players
3. Liga players